Galileo Galilei (1564–1642) was a scientist and philosopher.

Galileo Galilei may also refer to:
 Galileo Galilei (opera), an opera by Philip Glass
 Galileo Galilei (band)
 Italian submarine Galileo Galilei
 SS Galileo Galilei, a cruise liner
 Galileo Galilei International Airport
 Galileo Galilei planetarium
 Galileo Galilei Institute for Theoretical Physics, a research institute in Italy
Galileo Galilei, a painting of Galileo by Peter Paul Rubens
Galileo Galilei, a translation by Adalet Cimcoz of Bertolt Brecht's Life of Galileo

See also
 Galileo (disambiguation)